The United Nations Educational, Scientific and Cultural Organization (UNESCO) World Heritage Sites are places of importance to cultural or natural heritage as described in the UNESCO World Heritage Convention, established in 1972. Following the breakup of Yugoslavia, the Socialist Republic of Macedonia declared independence as Republic of Macedonia in 1991 and succeeded the UNESCO convention on 30 April 1997 under the name the former Yugoslav Republic of Macedonia (due to the naming dispute with Greece). Following the Prespa agreement, the name of the country was officially changed to North Macedonia in 2019.

, there are two sites in North Macedonia inscribed on the list and further four on the tentative list. Natural and Cultural Heritage of the Ohrid region was inscribed at the 3rd UNESCO session in 1979. In 2019, the site was expanded to include the Albanian portion of the lake, thus becoming a transnational site.  In 2021, the Ancient and Primeval Beech Forests of the Carpathians and Other Regions of Europe site was extended to include a beech forest within Mavrovo National Park, the site is shared with 17 European countries. The tentative sites are the Cave Slatinski Izvor, the geological formation Markovi Kuli, the megalithic archaeo-astronomical complex Kokino, and the Church of St George in Kurbinovo.


World Heritage Sites 
UNESCO lists sites under ten criteria; each entry must meet at least one of the criteria. Criteria i through vi are cultural, and vii through x are natural.

Tentative list 
In addition to the sites inscribed on the World Heritage list, member states can maintain a list of tentative sites that they may consider for nomination. Nominations for the World Heritage list are only accepted if the site was previously listed on the tentative list. As of 2021, North Macedonia recorded four sites on its tentative list.

References 

North Macedonia geography-related lists
Macedonian culture
 List
North Macedonia
World Heritage Sites